Radium nitrate is a radioactive salt with the formula Ra(NO3)2. It is a white solid, but old samples appear yellowish-grey. It has a lower solubility than barium nitrate. It decomposes at 280 °C to radium oxide.

Production
Radium nitrate is produced by the reaction of radium carbonate or radium sulfate with nitric acid:
RaCO3 + HNO3 → Ra(NO3)2 + CO2 + H2O

References

Radium compounds
Nitrates